Jalen Jones (born May 27, 1993) is an American professional basketball player for U-BT Cluj-Napoca of the Romanian Liga Națională. He played college basketball for the SMU Mustangs and the Texas A&M Aggies.

High school career
Jones first attended Mansfield Timberview High School. In his junior season, he averaged 18.8 points and 9.8 rebounds and was selected first team all-district and first team all-region. In his senior season he transferred to Justin F. Kimball High School where he averaged 18.0 points and 9.0 rebounds and was named to the 2011 all-state tournament team.

College career
After graduating from high school, Jones began his collegiate career at Southern Methodist University, where he averaged 14 points and 7 rebounds per game as a sophomore. He redshirted a year and transferred to Texas A&M. As a junior, he was named to the second-team All-SEC and teamed with Danuel House to lead the Aggies to the NIT. Jones was named to the coaches' first-team All-SEC as a senior, and the Aggies reached the NCAA Tournament. He averaged 15 points and seven rebounds per game during his final season at Texas A&M.

Professional career

Maine Red Claws (2016–2017)
After going undrafted in the 2016 NBA draft, Jones joined the Toronto Raptors for the 2016 NBA Summer League. In five games for the Raptors, he averaged 3.2 points and 2.0 rebounds in 8.9 minutes per game. On September 26, 2016, he signed with the Boston Celtics. However, he was waived by the Celtics on October 20 after appearing in two preseason games. On October 31, Jones was acquired by the Maine Red Claws of the NBA Development League as an affiliate player of the Celtics.

New Orleans Pelicans (2017–2018)
Jones was signed to a two-way contract by the New Orleans Pelicans on August 2, 2017. For the majority of this season, Jones would split his playing time between New Orleans and a G-League affiliate, the Greensboro Swarm.

On January 8, 2018, Jones was waived by the Pelicans.

Dallas Mavericks (2018)
He signed a two-way contract with the Dallas Mavericks on January 11, 2018. Throughout the rest of the year, he split his playing time between the Mavericks and their G League affiliate, the Texas Legends. He was waived by the Mavericks on July 14, 2018.

Cleveland Cavaliers/Canton Charge (2018–2019)
On December 2, 2018, Jones was signed to a two-way contract by the Cleveland Cavaliers. Under the terms of the deal, he splits time between the Cavs and their G League affiliate, the Canton Charge. On January 15, 2019, Jones was waived by the Cavaliers.

Kirolbet Baskonia (2019)
On January 22, 2019, Jones signed with Kirolbet Baskonia of the Liga ACB and the EuroLeague until the end of the season.

Capital City Go-Go (2019–2020)
On October 16, 2019, the Washington Wizards announced that they had signed Jones. He was waived three days later. He was then added to the roster of the Capital City Go-Go of the NBA G League. Jones tallied 30 points, seven rebounds and two assists on November 10 in a win over the Grand Rapids Drive. He missed a game against the College Park Skyhawks on December 12 with a leg injury. On January 26, 2020, Jones scored 22 points and added seven rebounds, three assists and one block in a loss to the Canton Charge. He averaged 19 points and 8 rebounds per game.

Pallacanestro Varese (2020–2022)
On November 9, 2020, Jones signed with Pallacanestro Varese of the Italian Lega Basket Serie A. On November 16, it was announced that he would undergo season-ending surgery following the rupture of the Achilles tendon in his left leg. The Lega Basket communicated on January 8, that Jones was excluded from the rest of the 2020–21 season.

JL Bourg (2022)
On January 4, 2022, he has signed with JL Bourg of the LNB Pro A.

Hapoel Haifa (2022–2023) 
On July 10, 2022, Jones signed with Hapoel Haifa of the Israeli Basketball Premier League.

U-BT Cluj-Napoca (2023–present) 
On January 13, 2023, he signed with U BT Cluj-Napoca of the Romanian Liga Națională.

Career statistics

NBA

Regular season

|-
| style="text-align:left;"| 
| style="text-align:left;"| New Orleans
| 4 || 0 || 4.8 || .250 || 1.000 || 1.000 || .8|| .0|| .0 || .0 || 1.3
|-
| style="text-align:left;"| 
| style="text-align:left;"| Dallas
| 12 || 0 || 13.5 || .397 || .360 || .588 || 2.9 || .3 || .4 || .1 || 5.8
|-
| style="text-align:left;"| 
| style="text-align:left;"| Cleveland
| 16 || 0 || 13.4 || .419 || .357 || .704 || 2.1 || .4 || .6 || .1 || 5.1
|- class="sortbottom"
| style="text-align:center;" colspan="2"| Career
| 32 || 0 || 12.3 || .400 || .370 || .674 || 2.3 || .3 || .4 || .1 || 4.8

Personal life
Jones is the son of Reginald and Yolanda Jones. He majored in university studies leadership.

References

External links
Texas A&M Aggies bio
SMU Mustangs bio

1993 births
Living people
21st-century African-American sportspeople
African-American basketball players
American expatriate basketball people in Spain
American men's basketball players
Basketball players from Dallas
Canton Charge players
Capital City Go-Go players
Cleveland Cavaliers players
CS Universitatea Cluj-Napoca (men's basketball) players
Dallas Mavericks players
Greensboro Swarm players
Hapoel Haifa B.C. players
JL Bourg-en-Bresse players
Liga ACB players
Maine Red Claws players
New Orleans Pelicans players
Power forwards (basketball)
Saski Baskonia players
Small forwards
SMU Mustangs men's basketball players
Texas A&M Aggies men's basketball players
Texas Legends players
Undrafted National Basketball Association players
United States men's national basketball team players